Adam James Whitehead (born 28 March 1980) is a male former breaststroke swimmer from Coventry, England.

Swimming career
Whitehead competed at the 2000 Summer Olympics in Sydney, Australia. There he was eliminated in the qualifying heats of the men's 100 m and 200 m breaststroke.

He represented England and won a bronze medal in the 200 metres breaststroke event, at the 1998 Commonwealth Games in Kuala Lumpur, Malaysia. Four years later he won a gold medal and silver medal in the breaststroke events at the 2002 Commonwealth Games.

At the ASA National British Championships he won the 50 metres breaststroke and the 100 metres breaststroke in 1999. However, in his strongest event, the 200 metres breaststroke, he won the title three times (1998, 1999 and 2000).

Personal life
After this, he worked with the Dame Kelly Holmes Trust as an athlete mentor, using the experiences and skills he gained as an elite sports performer to inspire and support young people, and later in a management role.

He attended Henley College Coventry

See also
 List of Commonwealth Games medallists in swimming (men)

References

External links
 
 
 
 

1980 births
Living people
Sportspeople from Coventry
Swimmers at the 2000 Summer Olympics
Olympic swimmers of Great Britain
Commonwealth Games gold medallists for England
Commonwealth Games silver medallists for England
Commonwealth Games bronze medallists for England
Swimmers at the 1998 Commonwealth Games
Swimmers at the 2002 Commonwealth Games
English breaststroke swimmers
English male swimmers
Commonwealth Games medallists in swimming
Universiade medalists in swimming
Alumni of Henley College Coventry
Universiade bronze medalists for Great Britain
Medalists at the 2001 Summer Universiade
Medallists at the 1998 Commonwealth Games
Medallists at the 2002 Commonwealth Games